Mekled Hamied (died December 2003) was a top Islamic Jihad commander who was killed during an Israeli air strike on his car in the last week of 2003.

References

Year of birth missing
2003 deaths
Islamic Jihad Movement in Palestine members